Bosnia and Herzegovina has participated in the Eurovision Song Contest 19 times since making its debut in 1993, after coming second in the qualification round "Kvalifikacija za Millstreet". Prior to 1993, Bosnia and Herzegovina participated in the Eurovision Song Contest as part of Yugoslavia.

Bosnia and Herzegovina's best result was in 2006, when Hari Mata Hari finished third with the song "Lejla". This remains the country's only top five result in the contest. Bosnia and Herzegovina returned to the contest for the first time since 2012 at the  contest, where they failed to advance from the semi-finals for the first time. They then withdrew once again from the contest.

Non-participations
Low average scores meant Bosnia and Herzegovina did not qualify for the contests in 1998 and 2000, and the country did not participate at the Eurovision Song Contest 2013 in Malmö for financial reasons. The national broadcaster had stated that it hoped to return to the contest in 2014, and on 18 November 2013 it submitted a preliminary application to compete in the 2014 contest, but on 18 December 2013 it was revealed that Bosnia & Herzegovina would not be returning for 2014.

On 9 September 2014, BHRT announced that they had submitted an application to the 2015 contest in Vienna, Austria. On 30 October 2014, it was announced by an official BHRT press release that participation was still in jeopardy due to the financial difficulties. EBU granted them a deadline extension until 14 November 2014 to make a final decision regarding their participation. On 17 November 2014, BHRT announced that they would not be competing in the 2015 contest, having not secured the necessary funds to finance their participation.

On 29 September 2016, BHRT announced once again its withdrawal from the competition in 2017, due to the difficult financial situation that the national broadcaster is currently facing.

The Bosnian head of delegation, Lejla Babović, confirmed on 29 December 2018 that BHRT's current primary goal is to return to Eurovision, but their current financial situation and mounting debts with the EBU make a return in the near future highly unlikely.

Participation overview

Conductors

Awards

Marcel Bezençon Awards

Commentators and spokespersons

Other shows

Photogallery

See also
Bosnia and Herzegovina in the Turkvision Song Contest

Notes

References

External links

Bosnia and Herzegovina Official ESC Website
Eurobosnia - a fan website devoted to Bosnian and ex Yugoslav entries
National Final of Bosnia
Points to and from Bosnia and Herzegovina eurovisioncovers.co.uk

 
Countries in the Eurovision Song Contest